Pape Niokhor Fall (born September 9, 1977) is a Senegalese former international footballer.

Career
He played for his home country ASC Jeanne d'Arc, Albanian KS Dinamo Tirana, Ivorian Africa Sports National and Ecuatorial Guinean Renacimiento FC.

He has played 18 matches for the Senegal national team. He also participated at the 2000 African Cup of Nations.

Honours
Jeanne d'Arc
Senegal Premier League: 1999, 2001, 2002 and 2003
Renacimiento
Equatoguinean Premier League: 2006

External sources
 

Living people
1977 births
Senegalese footballers
Senegal international footballers
2000 African Cup of Nations players
Senegalese expatriate footballers
FK Dinamo Tirana players
Expatriate footballers in Albania
Association football midfielders
ASC Jeanne d'Arc players
Africa Sports d'Abidjan players
Expatriate footballers in Equatorial Guinea